Dale Lester Boger is an American medicinal and organic chemist and former chair of the Department of Chemistry at The Scripps Research Institute in La Jolla, CA.

Dale Boger was born on August 22, 1953, in Hutchinson, Kansas.  He studied chemistry at the University of Kansas (B.S., 1975), Ph.D. 1980, Harvard University, under Professor E. J. Corey.  Following graduate school, he joined the faculty at the University of Kansas where he became assistant/associate professor of medicinal chemistry (1979–1985).

In 1985, he started at Purdue University, where he was professor of chemistry (1985–1991). He is Richard and Alice Cramer Professor of Chemistry and member of the Skaggs Institute for Chemical Biology at The Scripps Research Institute.

Boger is active in the field of organic chemistry with research interests including natural product synthesis, synthetic methodology, medicinal chemistry, and combinatorial chemistry.  He is also the author of a popular book on synthetic organic chemistry: Modern Organic Synthesis Lecture Notes (TSRI Press, 1999).

Awards 
Dale Boger has received numerous awards and honors including:

NSF Predoctoral Fellowship, 1975–78
Searle Scholar Award, 1981–84
NIH Research Career Development Award, 1983–88
Alfred P. Sloan Fellow, 1985–89
ACS Arthur C. Cope Scholar Award, 1988
American Cyanamid Academic Award, 1988
Japan Promotion of Science Fellow, 1993
ISHC Katritzky Award in Heterocyclic Chemistry, 1997
Honorary Member, The Lund Chemical Society (Sweden), 1998
ACS Aldrich Award for Creativity in Organic Synthesis, 1999
A. R. Day Award, POCC 1999
Honorary Ph.D. Degree: Laurea Honors Causa, Univ. of Ferrara, 2000
Smissman Lecturer, Univ. of Kansas, 2000
Yamanouchi USA Faculty Award, 2000
Myron L. Bender & Muriel S. Bender Distinguished Summer Lectureship, Northwestern University, 2001
Paul Janssen Prize for Creativity in Organic Synthesis, 2002
Ross Lecturer, Dartmouth College, 2002
Fellow, American Association for the Advancement of Science, 2003
Adrien Albert Medal, Royal Society of Chemistry, 2003
ISI Highly Cited (top 100 chemists)
Alder Lecturer, University of Köln, 2005
Member, American Academy of Arts and Sciences, 2006
ACS Guenther Award in Natural Products, 2007 
Editor-in-Chief, Bioorganic & Medicinal Chemistry Letters, 1990–present
Executive Editorial Board Member, Tetrahedron Publications, 1990–present
ACS Medicinal Chemistry Division
Long Range Planning Committee, 1981–1983
Awards Committee, 1984–1986
Councilor, 1996–1999

References

Sources 
 https://web.archive.org/web/20070926225751/http://www.scripps.edu/chem/boger/db.html
 https://web.archive.org/web/20060911020926/https://www.chemistry.msu.edu/Lectureships/lectures.asp?series=DK&Year=1997

External links 
 Boger group - scripps.edu

Living people
1953 births
21st-century American chemists
Scripps Research faculty
University of Kansas alumni
Harvard University alumni
Purdue University faculty
University of Kansas faculty
People from Hutchinson, Kansas